Katigbak Enterprises, Inc., doing business as DCG Radio-TV Network, is a Philippine media network owned and majority-controlled by the Ojeda family led by Mulanay politician Joselito Ojeda. Its corporate headquarters are located at 1022 DCG Tower 1, Maharlika Hi-Way, Brgy. Isabang, Tayabas.

DCG stands for Domingo C. Garcia, Jr., a stakeholder of this company. It is formerly known as ConAmor Broadcasting Systems, Inc. prior to Garcia's acquisition of part of the company.

TV stations

-With several cable affiliates in Southern Tagalog.

Radio stations

AM stations

FM stations

Former stations

References

Television networks in the Philippines
Radio stations in the Philippines
Television channels and stations established in 1986
Radio stations established in 1986
1986 establishments in the Philippines